René Huyghe (3 May 1906 – 5 February 1997) was a French writer on the history, psychology and philosophy of art. He was also a curator at the Louvre's department of paintings (from 1930), a professor at the Collège de France and from 1960 a member of the Académie Française. He was the father of the writer François-Bernard Huyghe.

Biography
René Huyghe studied philosophy and aesthetics at the Sorbonne and the École du Louvre. Made a curator of the Louvre's department of paintings in 1930, he rose to chief curator and professor of the école du Louvre in 1936, aged only 30. He founded and edited the reviews L’Amour de l’Art and Quadrige. He was one of the first figures in France to make films on art, such as his Rubens (winner of a prize at the Venice Biennale), and founded the International Federation of Films on Art.

During the Second World War Huyghe helped the director of the French Musées Nationaux Jacques Jaujard to organise the evacuation of the Louvre's paintings into the unoccupied zone and took charge of their protection until the Liberation of France. In 1950, he was elected to the Collège de France, occupying the chair of psychology of the plastic arts. In 1966, he won the Erasmus Prize at The Hague.

In 1974, Huyghe was made director of the Musée Jacquemart-André. It was at this time that he first met the Japanese philosopher Daisaku Ikeda with whom he published a dialogue titled Dawn After Dark. The book was re-released in 2007 by the London-based publishing house I.B. Tauris.

As he was the creator of many TV shows about art abroad, he failed to realize his TV projects, always refused by French TV officials. With the victory of the socialist candidate at the Presidential election in May 1981, he was « persona non grata » on French TV.

Huyghe was president of UNESCO's international committee of experts for saving Venice and served on the Conseil artistique des Musées de France.

Honours 
Grand Officer of the Legion of Honour
Grand Cross of the National Order of Merit
Commander of the Order of Leopold

Main works
Histoire de l’art contemporain (Alcan, 1935)
Cézanne (Plon, 1936)
 L'univers de Watteau, dans Hélène Adhémar, Watteau : sa vie, son œuvre. Catalogue des peintures et illustration (P. Tisné, 1950)
La Peinture d’Occident Cent chefs-d’œuvre du musée du Louvre (Nouvelles éditions françaises, 1952)
Dialogue avec le visible (Flammarion, 1955)
L’Art et l’Homme, Vol I (editor) (Larousse, 1957) Vol II (1958) Vol III (1961)
Van Gogh (Flammarion, 1958)
L’Art et l’Homme (Flammarion, 1960)
Delacroix ou le Combat solitaire (Hachette, 1964)
Les Puissances de l’image (Flammarion, 1965)
Sens et destin de l’art (Flammarion, 1967)
L’Art et le Monde moderne (ed. with Jean Rudel) 2 volumes (Larousse, 1970)
Formes et Forces (Flammarion, 1971)
La Relève du Réel, la peinture française au XIXe siècle, impressionnisme, symbolisme (Flammarion, 1974)
Ce que je crois (Grasset, 1974)
La nuit appelle l'aurore, dialogue orient-occident sur la crise contemporaine (with Daisaku Ikeda) (Flammarion, 1976)
La Relève de l’Imaginaire, la peinture française au XIXe siècle, réalisme et romantisme (Flammarion, 1981)
Les Signes du temps et l’Art moderne (Flammarion, 1985)
Se perdre dans Venise (with Marcel Brion) (Arthaud, 1987)
Psychologie de l’art, résumé des cours du Collège de France (Le Rocher, 1991)
Dawn After Dark: A Dialogue with Daisaku Ikeda (I.B. Tauris, 2007)

References

1906 births
1997 deaths
20th-century essayists
20th-century French historians
20th-century French male writers
20th-century French non-fiction writers
20th-century philosophers
Academic staff of the Collège de France
Curators from Paris
École du Louvre alumni
French art critics
French art historians
French essayists
French male non-fiction writers
French philosophers
Grand Cross of the Ordre national du Mérite
Grand Officiers of the Légion d'honneur
Members of the Académie Française
People associated with the Louvre
People from Arras
Philosophers of art
Philosophy writers
Social commentators
Social philosophers
University of Paris alumni